Automeropsis is a genus of moths in the family Saturniidae first described by Claude Lemaire in 1969.

Species
Automeropsis umbrata (Boisduval, 1875)

References

Hemileucinae
Moth genera